Régis Amarante Lima de Quadros (born 3 August 1976) is a Brazilian football coach and a former player who played as a central-defender. He is the coach of Rio Verde.

Club career
Régis played for Fluminense, Internacional and São Paulo in the Campeonato Brasileiro. He also had a spell with Saturn in the Russian Premier League, and Viborg in the Danish Superliga.

Honours 
Internacional
 Campeonato Gaúcho: 1997

Fluminense
 Campeonato Carioca: 2002

References

1976 births
Living people
Footballers from Porto Alegre
Brazilian footballers
Brazilian football managers
Brazilian expatriate footballers
Campeonato Brasileiro Série A players
Campeonato Brasileiro Série B players
Russian Premier League players
Danish Superliga players
Campeonato Brasileiro Série D managers
Expatriate footballers in Russia
Expatriate men's footballers in Denmark
Sport Club Internacional players
Fluminense FC players
São Paulo FC players
FC Saturn Ramenskoye players
Cruzeiro Esporte Clube players
Brasiliense Futebol Clube players
Associação Atlética Ponte Preta players
Coritiba Foot Ball Club players
Viborg FF players
Esporte Clube Juventude players
Paysandu Sport Club players
Figueirense FC players
Vila Nova Futebol Clube players
Sociedade Esportiva Recreativa e Cultural Brasil managers
Esporte Clube Avenida managers
Boavista Sport Club managers
Esporte Clube Rio Verde managers
Association football defenders